Grenada competed at the 1996 Summer Olympics in Atlanta, United States with five athletes, all competing in track and field.

Results by event

Athletics
Men's 4 × 400 m Relay
 Richard Britton, Rufus Jones, Alleyne Francique, and Clint Williams
 Heat — DSQ (→ did not advance)

Men's Long Jump
 Kenny Lewis
 Qualification — 7.41m (→ did not advance)

See also
Grenada at the 1995 Pan American Games

References
Official Olympic Reports
sports-reference

Nations at the 1996 Summer Olympics
1996
Olympics